The Apostolic Nunciature to Tanzania is an ecclesiastical office of the Catholic Church in Tanzania. It is a diplomatic post of the Holy See, whose representative is called the Apostolic Nuncio with the rank of an ambassador.

Representatives of the Holy See to Tanzania
Apostolic pro-nuncios
Pierluigi Sartorelli (19 April 1968 - 22 December 1970)
Franco Brambilla (24 December 1970 - 21 November 1981)
Apostolic nuncios 
Gian Vincenzo Moreni (29 April 1982 - 8 September 1990)
Agostino Marchetto (7 December 1990 - 18 May 1994)
Francisco-Javier Lozano Sebastián (9 July 1994 - 20 March 1999)
Luigi Pezzuto (22 May 1999 - 2 April 2005)
Joseph Chennoth (15 June 2005 - 15 August 2011)
Francisco Montecillo Padilla (10 November 2011 - 5 April 2016)
Marek Solczyński (25 April 2017 - 2 February 2022)
Angelo Accattino (2 January 2023 - present)

See also
Foreign relations of the Holy See
List of diplomatic missions of the Holy See

References

Tanzania
 
Holy See–Tanzania relations